{{DISPLAYTITLE:C24H31NO}}
The molecular formula C24H31NO (molar mass: 349.51 g/mol, exact mass: 349.2406 u) may refer to:

 AB-001 (1-pentyl-3-(1-adamantoyl)indole)
 Abiraterone
 3-Keto-5α-abiraterone
 Dipipanone

Molecular formulas